National Highway 330B, commonly referred to as NH 330B is a national highway in  India. It is a spur road of National Highway 330. NH-330B traverses the state of Uttar Pradesh in India.

Route
Gonda - Jarwal.

Junction list

 Terminal near Gonda.
 Terminal near Jarwal.

See also
 List of National Highways in India by highway number
 List of National Highways in India by state
 National Highways Development Project

References

External links 

 NH 330B on OpenStreetMap

National highways in India
National Highways in Uttar Pradesh